Woodville Football Club was an Australian rules football club that competed in the South Australian National Football League (SANFL) from 1964 to 1990, when it merged in 1991 with the West Torrens Football Club to form the Woodville-West Torrens Eagles.

Based in the western suburbs of Adelaide, South Australia, Woodville derived its name from the suburb it was located in.

The club's lack of success was unparalleled in the VFL or WAFL with the club receiving 9 wooden spoons, including 6 times in succession 1980-1985, in 27 years whilst only making the finals 3 times without a grand final appearance.

Club history
There are newspaper references to a  Woodville Football Club dating back to the 19th century, when Woodville and Adelaide were the only teams, but the modern club was formed in 1938 to play in local amateur competitions. In 1959 the existing SANFL clubs agreed to submissions from Woodville and Central District to expand the competition from eight to ten teams on the proviso they enter the SANFL reserves competition on a five-year apprenticeship before gaining admission to the league competition in 1964. The team was then known as the "Woodville Woodpeckers".

Its inaugural season was an indicator of its success (or lack thereof) for the remainder of its existence. The club won just three matches, all against Central Districts. In its 27 seasons in the SANFL, Woodville reached the finals only three times: in 1979, 1986 and 1987; its best result was 3rd position in 1986.

Woodville's most successful player was Malcolm Blight, who won the SANFL's Magarey Medal and gained selection in the All Australian team in 1972. He would later play for North Melbourne Football Club in the Victorian Football League (VFL), winning the Brownlow Medal in 1978 and joining a select group of players who had won the highest individual honor in both the SANFL and VFL competitions.

Blight returned to Woodville in 1983 as Captain-Coach, leading the club through its most successful period. His first season back in Adelaide was unsuccessful, with the club finishing with the wooden spoon. From there the team started to gel and by 1986 was considered an outside chance of obtaining their first league premiership, but finished 3rd after losing to eventual premiers Glenelg in the Preliminary Final. They also made the finals in 1987, but came 5th, losing the Elimination Final to Glenelg.

Blight stood down at the end of 1987 and was replaced by Port Adelaide Football Club legend and four time Magarey Medallist Russell Ebert. Under Ebert's coaching, Woodville won the SANFL Night Competition in 1988, the Escort Cup, defeating Port Adelaide 14.12 (96) to 7.9 (51) at Football Park. It would be the last trophy the Woodville Football Club would win in the SANFL. Woodville had also won the Coca-Cola Cup series in 1972, a competition between clubs which did not make the final four.

As a struggling club with limited fans and finances, there were regular calls throughout the 1980s to merge Woodville with another club. In 1990, with the imminent entry of the South Australian-based Adelaide Crows into the national Australian Football League (formerly the VFL), it was decided to amalgamate Woodville with neighbouring West Torrens Football Club. In an apt moment, Woodville and West Torrens were drawn to play each other in their respective final games, with Woodville emerging victorious by 50 points, 24.10 (154) to 15.19 (104) at the Adelaide Oval. Before the game a number of legends from both clubs were introduced to the crowd.

Woodville's captain in their last game was popular veteran Ralph Sewer (regular captain Romano Negri was in the team but stepped aside for the last game to give Sewer the honor). The 38-year-old Sewer who was playing his 382nd and last game of SANFL football. "Zip Zap" as he was known, made his league debut with Woodville in 1969 and was playing his 325th game for the club. He was Woodville's leading goal kicker in 1975, and had won the club's best & Fairest award in 1978, the same year he was awarded with Life Membership from the club and Player Life Membership from the SANFL. Sewer, who had played 57 games for perennial contenders Glenelg from 1981–84, is the only player to have played in four decades of football in the SANFL.

The Woodville Warriors and the West Torrens Eagles merged after the completion of the 1990 season and have since participated in the SANFL as the Woodville-West Torrens Eagles, winning the SANFL premiership in 1993, 2006, 2011, 2020, and 2021.

Awards
Premierships
SANFL League: Nil
SANFL Night Premierships: 1 - 1988. (Also, in 1972 they won the Coca-Cola cup, a competition between teams which did not make the final four).
SANFL Reserves: 2 - 1973, 1987
SANFL Under 19's: Nil
SANFL Under 17's: 5 - 1962, 1964, 1967, 1968, 1973

Magarey Medalists
Malcolm Blight (1972)

SANFL leading goalkickers
Glynn Hewitt: 83 goals (1979)
Malcolm Blight: 126 goals (1985)
Stephen Nichols: 103 goals (1986, 1988)

South Australian Football Hall of Fame members
Barrie Barbary (2002)
Malcolm Blight (2002)
Ralph Sewer (2002)
Ray Huppatz (2003)
Andrew Rogers (2005)
Bob Simunsen (2006)
Bill Sanders (2011)

Club colours and emblems
Red and White (1938–1939)
Purple and White (1940–1946)
Green and Gold (1947–1990)

On entry to the SANFL, Woodville were known as "The Woodpeckers" but changed to "The Warriors" in 1983.

Club records

Home Ground: Woodville Oval (1941–90) (SANFL league games 1964-90)
Record Attendance at Woodville Oval: 11,026 v Port Adelaide in Round 18, 1986
Record Attendance: 39,066 v Port Adelaide at Football Park, 1986 SANFL 1st Semi-final
Most Games: 325 by Ralph Sewer (1969–80, 1984–90)
Most Goals in a Season: 126 by Malcolm Blight in 1985
First player to kick 100 goals in an SANFL season: Trevor Pierson (1982 - 104 goals)
Most Years as Coach: 5 by Malcolm Blight (1983–87)

Famous players
Ralph Sewer: Debuting in 1969 and playing his final match in 1990 aged 38, Sewer became not only the only man to have played in the SANFL in four different decades, but also the only grandfather. His 325 games was a club record.
 Barrie Barbary
 Malcolm Blight
 Richard Champion
 Ray Huppatz
 Allen Jakovich
 John Klug
 Romano Negri
 John Roberts
 Bob Simunsen
 Andrew Rogers
 Des O’Dwyer.

References

External links 
 Woodville-West Torrens Official Site
 Woodville biography, australianfootball.com

Former South Australian National Football League clubs
Australian rules football clubs in South Australia
1938 establishments in Australia
1990 disestablishments in Australia